Love is You is the first mini album by Cherry Belle. The album was released in 2011 by Catz Records. Songs from the album were released as the first single "Dilema" and the second single "Love Is You". The album simultaneously debut album and the last Wenda and Devi along Cherrybelle before it is declared by the producer resigned on April 12, 2012. Packed in unique with the dominant color of soft pink, mini album Love is You consists of 1 CD, 1 DVD and 1 photobooks contains the lyrics, photographs and biographical data of each personnel of this girl group. In the first copies in DVD format with a black cover, the fans were treated Dilema (Music Video), video testimonials by Cherry Belle, Dilemma making, video live performance Cherry Belle, and Dilema (dance version).

With the theme of love, there is the song "I'll Be There for You" contains simple lyrics that is easily digested by music lovers. In addition to "I'll Be There for You", the song "Love Is You" is also packaged nicely with the theme of love which today is popular with young people.

Slightly different from the others, the song "Beautiful" trying to carry the message 'just be yourself'. This song seemed to convince the women that are not only beautiful in appearance, but also from the heart.

Track listing

External links 
 Mini Album Cherry Belle: Galau Cinta dan Sahabat

2011 EPs
Cherrybelle albums
Pop music EPs